Ronald Warwick Radford  (born 3 December 1949) is an Australian curator, who was the Director of the National Gallery of Australia (NGA) from 2004 until 2014.  He was previously the Director of the Art Gallery of South Australia in Adelaide.

He was born in Warragul, Victoria and studied at Scotch College, Melbourne, the University of Melbourne and RMIT University.  He was an education officer at the National Gallery of Victoria in 1971 and 1972.  He was director of the Ballarat Fine Art Gallery from 1973 to 1980, a position previously held by the founding director of the NGA, James Mollison.

From 1980 to 1988 he was curator of European and Australian Paintings and Sculpture at the Art Gallery of South Australia.  As director between 1991 and 2004, he built up the collection of Australian art, particularly from the Colonial period, developed a strong holding in Asian art and expanded the Renaissance collection.

Radford has announced his intention to lend out Old Masters (European art, prior to the 19th century) for long-term display to state galleries.  He considers the collection of less than 30 paintings, put together by Mollison to give context to the modern collection, as too small to make any impact on the public. He has been quoted as saying that the gallery should concentrate on its strengths—European Art of the first half of the 20th century, 20th-century American art, photography, Asian art and the 20th-century drawing collection, and to fill the gaps in the Australian collection.

Publications
Radford has written a number of books on art, mainly exhibition guides, including:
 Recent Aboriginal Painting incorporating the Maude Vizard-Wholohan. Art Prize Purchase Awards 1988, Art Gallery of South Australia (1988),  
 Tom Roberts, Art Gallery of South Australia (1996)
 The William Bowmore Collection: The Fine Art of Giving, Art Gallery of South Australia (1999),  
 Our Country: Australian Federation Landscapes 1900-1914, Art Gallery of South Australia (2001)
 19th Century Australian Art - M.J.M. Carter Collection, Art Gallery of South Australia (1993),

Notes

1949 births
Living people
Australian curators
Directors of the National Gallery of Australia
RMIT University alumni
University of Melbourne alumni
People educated at Scotch College, Melbourne
Members of the Order of Australia
Chevaliers of the Ordre des Arts et des Lettres
Recipients of the Centenary Medal
People from Warragul